Bernard Bosquier (born 19 June 1942 in Thonon-les-Bains, Haute-Savoie) is a French former international footballer who played as a defender.

Career
Bosquier came up from Olympique Alès, and signed with FC Sochaux-Montbéliard in 1961, where he became an excellent defender playing at right back before moving to centre back later at Olympique Marseille.

He quickly earned his first cap for France on 2 December 1964, aged 22, against Belgium. He was then part of France squad at the FIFA World Cup 1966 in England playing in all France's games.

Coming back from the World Cup he signed with AS Saint-Étienne, where he won his first titles and was widely regarded as the best French footballer of the 1960s, winning the French player of the year award in 1967 & 1968.

He surprisingly left Forez for Olympique Marseille along with goalkeeper Georges Carnus in 1971 winning the "double" with Olympique Marseille in his first season.  He finished his football career at FC Martigues eventually making 354 appearances in 11 seasons. His goalscoring record of 43 goals in very good for a defender and was helped by his great free-kick prowess.

He had then a short career of sport director and discovered talented players such as Grégory Coupet or Ľubomír Moravčík when he worked for AS Saint-Étienne. He currently organises coaching for young footballers.

Honours
Sochaux
Coupe Charles Drago: 1962–63, 1963–64
Division 2 runner-up: 1963–64

Saint-Étienne
Division 1: 1966–67, 1967–68, 1968–69, 1969–70; runner-up: 1970–71
Coupe de France: 1967–68, 1969–70
Trophée des Champions: 1967, 1968, 1969

Marseille
Division 1: 1971–72
Coupe de France: 1971–72

Individual
French Footballer of the Year: 1967, 1968

References
Profile 

official site of his stages
Bio and photos
French Footballer of the year
Record of France Caps
Tribute to Bosquier from Marseille
French Footballer of the year
Clip of Bosquier in 1966 World Cup action
Honours Record

External links
 
 

1942 births
Living people
People from Thonon-les-Bains
French footballers
France international footballers
Association football defenders
Olympique Alès players
FC Sochaux-Montbéliard players
AS Saint-Étienne players
Olympique de Marseille players
FC Martigues players
Ligue 1 players
1966 FIFA World Cup players
Sportspeople from Haute-Savoie
Footballers from Auvergne-Rhône-Alpes